A context-sensitive grammar (CSG) is a formal grammar in which the left-hand sides and right-hand sides of any production rules may be surrounded by a context of terminal and nonterminal symbols. Context-sensitive grammars are more general than context-free grammars, in the sense that there are languages that can be described by a CSG but not by a context-free grammar. Context-sensitive grammars are less general (in the same sense) than unrestricted grammars. Thus, CSGs are positioned between context-free and unrestricted grammars in the Chomsky hierarchy.

A formal language that can be described by a context-sensitive grammar, or, equivalently, by a noncontracting grammar or a linear bounded automaton, is called a context-sensitive language. Some textbooks actually define CSGs as non-contracting, although this is not how Noam Chomsky defined them in 1959. This choice of definition makes no difference in terms of the languages generated (i.e. the two definitions are weakly equivalent), but it does make a difference in terms of what grammars are structurally considered context-sensitive; the latter issue was analyzed by Chomsky in 1963.

Chomsky introduced context-sensitive grammars as a way to describe the syntax of natural language where it is often the case that a word may or may not be appropriate in a certain place depending on the context. Walter Savitch has criticized the terminology "context-sensitive" as misleading and proposed "non-erasing" as better explaining the distinction between a CSG and an unrestricted grammar.

Although it is well known that certain features of languages (e.g. cross-serial dependency) are not context-free, it is an open question how much of CSGs' expressive power is needed to capture the context sensitivity found in natural languages. Subsequent research in this area has focused on the more computationally tractable mildly context-sensitive languages. The syntaxes of some visual programming languages can be described by context-sensitive graph grammars.

Formal definition

Formal grammar 
Let us notate a formal grammar as G = (N, Σ, P, S), with N a set of nonterminal symbols, Σ a set of terminal symbols, P a set of production rules, and S∈N the start symbol.

More generally, u is said to yield, or derive to, v, denoted as u ⇒* v, if v can be obtained from u by repeated application of production rules, that is, if  u = u1 ⇒ ... ⇒ un = v for some n≥0 and some strings u2, ..., un-1 ∈ (N∪Σ)*. In other words, the relation (⇒*) is the reflexive transitive closure of the relation (⇒).

The language of the grammar G is the set of all terminal-symbol strings derivable from its start symbol, formally: L(G) = { w ∈ Σ*: S ⇒* w }.
Derivations that do not end in a string composed of terminal symbols only are possible, but do not contribute to L(G).

Context-sensitive grammar 
A formal grammar is context-sensitive if each rule in P is either of the form  where  is the empty string, or of the form
 αAβ → αγβ

The name context-sensitive is explained by the α and β that form the context of A and determine whether A can be replaced with γ or not. This is different from a context-free grammar where the context of a nonterminal is not taken into consideration. Indeed, every production of a context-free grammar is of the form V → w where V is a single nonterminal symbol, and w is a string of terminals and/or nonterminals; w can be empty.

The only difference between context-sensitive grammars and unrestricted grammars is that γ can be empty in the unrestricted case.

The addition of the empty string allows the statement that the context sensitive languages are a proper superset of the context-free languages, rather than having to make the weaker statement that all context-free grammars with no  productions are also context sensitive grammars.

(Weakly) equivalent definitions 
Some definitions of a context-sensitive grammar only require that for any production rule of the form u → v, the length of u shall be less than or equal to the length of v.  This seemingly weaker requirement is in fact weakly equivalent, see Noncontracting grammar#Transforming into context-sensitive grammar. If the possibility of adding the empty string to a language is added to the strings recognized by the noncontracting grammars (which can never include the empty string) then the languages in these two definitions are identical.

The left-context- and right-context-sensitive grammars are defined by restricting the rules to just the form αA → αγ and to just Aβ → γβ, respectively. The languages generated by these grammars are also the full class of context-sensitive languages. The equivalence was established by Penttonen normal form.

Examples

anbncn 
The following context-sensitive grammar, with start symbol S, generates the canonical non-context-free language { anbncn : n ≥ 1 } :

Rules 1 and 2 allow for blowing-up S to anBC(BC)n-1; rules 3 to 6 allow for successively exchanging each CB to BC (four rules are needed for that since a rule CB → BC wouldn't fit into the scheme αAβ → αγβ); rules 7–10 allow replacing a non-terminals B and C with its corresponding terminals b and c respectively, provided it is in the right place.
 S
 →2 
 →2 
 →1 
 →3 
 →4 
 →5 
 →6 
 →3 
 →4 
 →5 
 →6 
 →3 
 →4 
 →5 
 →6 
 →7 
 →8 
 →8 
 →9 
 →10 
 →10

anbncndn, etc. 
More complicated grammars can be used to parse { anbncndn: n ≥ 1 }, and other languages with even more letters. Here we show a simpler approach using non-contracting grammars:
Start with a kernel of regular productions generating the sentential forms
 and then include the non contracting productions
,
,
,
,
,
,
,
,
,
.

ambncmdn 
A non contracting grammar (for which there is an equivalent CSG) for the language  is defined by
,
,
,
,
, 
, 
, and
.

.

a2i 
A noncontracting grammar for the language { a2i : i ≥ 1 } is constructed in Example 9.5 (p. 224) of (Hopcroft, Ullman, 1979):

Kuroda normal form 
Every context-sensitive grammar which does not generate the empty string can be transformed into a weakly equivalent one in Kuroda normal form. "Weakly equivalent" here means that the two grammars generate the same language. The normal form will not in general be context-sensitive, but will be a noncontracting grammar.

The Kuroda normal form is an actual normal form for non-contracting grammars.

Properties and uses

Equivalence to linear bounded automaton 
A formal language can be described by a context-sensitive grammar if and only if it is accepted by some linear bounded automaton (LBA). In some textbooks this result is attributed solely to Landweber and Kuroda. Others call it the Myhill–Landweber–Kuroda theorem. (Myhill introduced the concept of deterministic LBA in 1960. Peter S. Landweber published in 1963 that the language accepted by a deterministic LBA is context sensitive. Kuroda introduced the notion of non-deterministic LBA and the equivalence between LBA and CSGs in 1964.)

 it is still an open question whether every context-sensitive language can be accepted by a deterministic LBA.

Closure properties 
Context-sensitive languages are closed under complement. This 1988 result is known as the Immerman–Szelepcsényi theorem.
Moreover, they are closed under union, intersection, concatenation, substitution, inverse homomorphism, and Kleene plus.

Every recursively enumerable language L can be written as h(L) for some context-sensitive language L and some string homomorphism h.

Computational problems 
The decision problem that asks whether a certain string s belongs to the language of a given context-sensitive grammar G, is PSPACE-complete. Moreover, there are context-sensitive grammars whose languages are PSPACE-complete. In other words, there is a context-sensitive grammar G such that deciding whether a certain string s belongs to the language of G is PSPACE-complete (so G is fixed and only s is part of the input of the problem).

The emptiness problem for context-sensitive grammars (given a context-sensitive grammar G, is L(G)=∅ ?) is undecidable.

As model of natural languages 
Savitch has proven the following theoretical result, on which he bases his criticism of CSGs as basis for natural language: for any recursively enumerable set R, there exists a context-sensitive language/grammar G which can be used as a sort of proxy to test membership in R in the following way: given a string s, s is in R if and only if there exists a positive integer n for which scn is in G, where c is an arbitrary symbol not part of R.

It has been shown that nearly all natural languages may in general be characterized by context-sensitive grammars, but the whole class of CSGs seems to be much bigger than natural languages.  Worse yet, since the aforementioned decision problem for CSGs is PSPACE-complete, that makes them totally unworkable for practical use, as a polynomial-time algorithm for a PSPACE-complete problem would imply P=NP.

It was proven that some natural languages are not context-free, based on identifying so-called cross-serial dependencies and unbounded scrambling phenomena. However this does not necessarily imply that the class of CSGs is necessary to capture "context sensitivity" in the colloquial sense of these terms in natural languages. For example, linear context-free rewriting systems (LCFRSs) are strictly weaker than CSGs but can account for the phenomenon of cross-serial dependencies; one can write a LCFRS grammar for {anbncndn | n ≥ 1} for example.

Ongoing research on computational linguistics has focused on formulating other classes of languages that are "mildly context-sensitive" whose decision problems are feasible, such as tree-adjoining grammars, combinatory categorial grammars, coupled context-free languages, and linear context-free rewriting systems.  The languages generated by these formalisms properly lie between the context-free and context-sensitive languages.

More recently, the class PTIME has been identified with range concatenation grammars, which are now considered to be the most expressive of the mild-context sensitive language classes.

See also
 Chomsky hierarchy
 Growing context-sensitive grammar
 Definite clause grammar#Non-context-free grammars
 List of parser generators for context-sensitive grammars

Notes

References

Further reading

External links
 Earley Parsing for Context-Sensitive Grammars

Formal languages
Grammar frameworks